is a Japanese child actress.

Career 
Kobayashi first appeared on TV in a commercial for Calpis in 2009, and subsequently gained popularity as a child actress in Japanese TV dramas such as Yōkame no Semi and Natsu no Koi wa Nijiiro ni Kagayaku in 2010, and Wataru Seken wa Oni Bakari and Namae o Nakushita Megami in 2011.

Filmography

Live-action film 
  (2010)
 Spotlight (2012)

Animated film 
 Okko's Inn (2018), Oriko Seki
 The Tunnel to Summer, the Exit of Goodbyes (2022), Karen Tōno

Japanese dub 
 The Peanuts Movie (2015), Sally Brown
 The Lion King (2019), Young Nala

Television 
  (Fuji TV, 2009)
  (NHK, 2009)
  (Fuji TV, 2010)
  (NHK, 2010)
  (NTV, 2010)
  (Fuji TV, 2010)
  (TBS, 2010)
  (Fuji TV, 2011)
  (TBS, 2011)
  (Fuji TV, 2011)
  (TV Asahi, 2012)
  (Fuji TV, 2012), as Sayo
  (TV Tokyo, 2013), as Momo
  (Fuji TV, 2013)
  (NHK, 2013)
  (Tokyo MX, 2014) – Erssime (voice)
  (TBS, 2014) – Momoko Sugimura
  (TV Asahi, 2015) – Elena
My Hero Academia (僕のヒーローアカデミア) (NNS, 2019-) – Eri

Discography

Singles 
Kobayashi and Kanon Tani released two music singles as part of the duo "Star Flower".
 "Toshishita no Otokonoko" (August 2012), cover of the 1975 song by the Candies
 "White Love" (December 2012), cover of the 1997 number-one song by Speed

References

External links 
 
 Official agency profile 
 

2004 births
Living people
Japanese child actresses
Japanese voice actresses